Emil Kaschub was a German doctor who conducted experiments on Nazi concentration camp prisoners. On the instructions of the Wehrmacht, healthy prisoners were subjected to applications and injections of toxic substances. The subsequent wounds, often festering and blistered, were documented for "scientific" enlightenment.

References 

Physicians in the Nazi Party
Nazi human subject research
Holocaust perpetrators
German military personnel of World War II